The Midwest Hotel is a hotel located in Kansas City, Missouri. The hotel is a building dating from 1915, and is located in the Crossroads Arts District. It has been listed on the National Register of Historic Places since 2004. It is currently vacant, sold on the Jackson County Courthouse steps, and is possibly at risk of demolition.

The hotel, in 1991, was the setting for exterior shots in the Ministry music video for Just One Fix. The music video focused on heavy opiate drug use and featured author William S. Burroughs as guest vocalist.  The song was released on the band's 1992 album entitled Psalm 69 and has remained one of most popular tracks the band has ever produced.

References

External links

Hotels in Kansas City, Missouri
Hotel buildings on the National Register of Historic Places in Missouri
National Register of Historic Places in Kansas City, Missouri